Fakılar is a village in Çamlıyayla district of Mersin Province, Turkey. It is situated in the Taurus Mountains. The population of the village was 726 as of 2012. The main crops of Fakılar are cherry and hickory nut.

References 

Villages in Çamlıyayla District